Spyridon Prosalentis (Corfu, 1830 – Athens, 1895) was a Greek portrait painter of the Heptanese School. His first name is sometimes seen as Spyros.

Biography
Prosalentis was descended from a noble Byzantine family, who fled to areas under the control of the Venetian Republic after the Fall of Constantinople. His father was Pavlos Prosalentis, who is considered to be the first significant modern Greek sculptor and, in 1811, created Greece's first art school.

His earliest lessons naturally came from his father. Later, he finished his education at the Accademia di Belle Arti di Venezia. He remained in Italy until 1865 and, when he returned, received an appointment as Professor of painting at the Athens School of Fine Arts. For unknown reasons, he resigned from that position the following year and went back to Venice.

In 1870, he won a major award at the "Exhibition of Fine Arts" in Parma, and was invited to return to Greece by King George I. He settled in Athens and immediately began to create murals in the chapel of the Old Royal Palace. In 1876, a second chair of painting was established at the School of Fine Arts and he received another appointment as Professor, this time remaining in that position until his death.

Upon commission from the Royal Family of Greece, he completed several series of portraits of notable personalities from the Greek Revolution, the University of Athens, and the War and Navy Departments. He also painted some domestic genre scenes, but those are much less familiar.

Gallery of portraits

References

External links

1830 births
1895 deaths
Artists from Corfu
Greek portrait painters
Painters of the Heptanese School
19th-century Greek painters
Accademia di Belle Arti di Venezia alumni
Academic staff of the Athens School of Fine Arts